Matilde Muñoz Sampedro (2 March 1900 – 14 April 1969) was a Spanish film actress whose career stretched from the 1940s through the 1960s.

Biography
Muñoz was married to actor Rafael Bardem and the couple had two children: Juan Antonio and Pilar. Her grandchildren are Carlos, Mónica, and Javier. Muñoz was born in Madrid in 1900 and her sisters, Guadalupe and Mercedes, were both actresses. She died in Madrid.

Filmography

Television
Muñoz starred in one episode each of Teatro de familia and Escuela de maridos, both in 1964.

Film

External links

References

1900 births
1969 deaths
Actresses from Madrid
Spanish film actresses
20th-century Spanish actresses
Bardem family